Broadway station may refer to:

Canada
Broadway–City Hall station, a rapid transit station in Vancouver, British Columbia
Commercial–Broadway station, a rapid transit station in Vancouver, British Columbia, previously named Broadway station and Commercial Drive station

United Kingdom
Broadway railway station, a reconstructed station in Worcestershire
Ealing Broadway station, a London Underground station serving the District and Piccadilly lines
Fulham Broadway tube station, a London Underground station serving the District line
Mill Hill Broadway railway station, a railway station in London
Tooting Broadway tube station, a London Underground station serving the Northern line
Broadway tram stop, a light rail stop in Manchester

United States
Broadway station (Caltrain), a commuter rail station in Burlingame, California
Broadway station (Detroit), a people mover station in Detroit, Michigan
Broadway station (LIRR), a commuter rail station in Queens, New York
Broadway station (MBTA) a subway station in Boston, Massachusetts
Broadway station (NJT), a commuter rail station in Fair Lawn, New Jersey
Broadway station (PATCO), a commuter rail station in Camden, New Jersey
Broadway station (Sacramento), a light rail station in Sacramento, California
Broadway and The Embarcadero station, a light rail station in San Francisco, California
Broadway Bus Terminal, in Paterson, New Jersey
Historic Broadway station, an under-construction light rail station in Los Angeles, California
I-25 & Broadway station, a light rail station in Denver, Colorado

New York City Subway 
Broadway (BMT Astoria Line) in Queens, serving the  trains
Broadway (BMT Myrtle Avenue Line), a closed elevated station in Brooklyn
Broadway (IND Crosstown Line) in Brooklyn, serving the  train
Broadway Ferry (BMT Jamaica Line), a demolished elevated station in Brooklyn
Broadway Junction (New York City Subway) a station complex in Brooklyn consisting of:
Broadway Junction (BMT Canarsie Line) serving the  train
Broadway Junction (IND Fulton Street Line) serving the  trains
Broadway Junction (BMT Jamaica Line) serving the  trains
Broadway–Lafayette Street (IND Sixth Avenue Line) in Manhattan, serving the  trains
East Broadway (IND Sixth Avenue Line) in Manhattan, serving the  train
74th Street-Broadway (IRT Flushing Line station) in Queens, serving the  train
Canal Street (New York City Subway)#Bridge Line platforms (lower level), originally named Broadway

Other
Broadway bus terminus in Chennai, India
Broadway's Best (radio station), a former satellite radio channel

See also
Broadway (disambiguation)